Nitratireductor basaltis is a Gram-negative, oxidase- and catalase-positive bacteria from the genus of Nitratireductor which was isolated from black sand from the Soesoggak beach on the Jeju Island in South Korea.

References

External links
Type strain of Nitratireductor basaltis at BacDive -  the Bacterial Diversity Metadatabase

Phyllobacteriaceae
Bacteria described in 2009